COSAT may refer to:

 Centre of Science and Technology (COSAT)
 Confederacion Sudamericana de Tenis (COSAT)
 Johnson & Johnson's Office of Corporate Science & Technology (COSAT)